Rémi Pillot (born 27 July 1990) is a French professional footballer who plays as a goalkeeper for Championnat National 2 club Les Herbiers.

Career
Pillot was born in Besançon. In August 2012, he signed for Belgian side Kortrijk where he took up the role as second goalkeeper behind South African player Darren Keet. He played all Belgian Cup games helping Kortrijk reach the semi-finals keeping three clean sheets in five matches. Pillot made his league debut in May 2013 against Lierse.

References

External links
 
 
 

1990 births
Living people
Sportspeople from Besançon
Association football goalkeepers
French footballers
AS Nancy Lorraine players
K.V. Kortrijk players
LB Châteauroux players
Les Herbiers VF players
Championnat National 2 players
Belgian Pro League players
Championnat National players
Ligue 2 players
Championnat National 3 players
French expatriate footballers
Expatriate footballers in Belgium
French expatriate sportspeople in Belgium
Footballers from Bourgogne-Franche-Comté